Best of Nina is the first compilation album by Filipina singer Nina. It was released exclusively in South Korea on July 15, 2009 by Warner Music Korea.

Background
Best of Nina contains eight hit singles and four other tracks taken from her 2002 album Heaven until 2006 album Nina, plus three unplugged tracks were also included from her 2005 live album Nina Live!.

In the said album, some of her hit singles were not included such as "Heaven", "Make You Mine", "A Girl Can Dream", and "I Don't Want to Be Your Friend". Instead of including these four hit singles on the album, she replaced them with some of her notable unreleased tracks such as "Is It Over", "Can't Say I Love You", "What If" and her OPM classic remake, "I'll Always Stay in Love This Way". Tracks from Nina Featuring the Hits of Barry Manilow, Nina Sings the Hits of Diane Warren and Renditions of the Soul were not included.

Track listing 

Source:

Release history

References

Nina Girado albums
2009 greatest hits albums